Shehzad Ahmed ( 16 April 1932 – 2 August 2012; sometimes spelled Shahzad Ahmad), was a Pakistani Urdu poet, writer and director of Majlis-i-Taraqqi-i-Adab, an old book library of Pakistan. Shehzad's poetry collection comprise about thirty books and with several other publications on psychology. In 1990s, he earned a national recognition and was awarded Pride of Performance award by the Government of Pakistan. He is also credited for translating non-Urdu poems into Urdu language.

Early life
Shehzad was born in Amritsar, British India on 16 April 1932. He later migrated to Pakistan following the Partition of India. Before his migration, he did matriculation in Amritsar. In 1956, he attended Government College University at Lahore where Shehzad did Master of Science in Psychology, and later in 1958, he did master's degree in Philosophy.

Literary career
Shehzad were initially associated with poetry reading interests. During his collage life, he was reciting poems he used to wrote, and later in 1958 he published his first poetry book titled Sadaf. Later, he continued working on publishing poems. His prominent poems or poetry books include Sadaf, Sitar, Bhujti Ankhain, Jalti, Tuta Huwa Pal, and Utray Meri Khak Per.

During his poetry career, he wrote about ninety Gazals, eleven Nazms and other poetic expressions on different subjects, including religious, social and love.

Death
Shehzad suffered from a health ailment and died in Lahore, Pakistan on 12 August 2012 after his health deteriorated.

References

External links
 Shehzad Ahmed profile on Rekhta

1932 births
2012 deaths
Poets from Lahore
20th-century Pakistani poets
Indian emigrants to Pakistan
Government College University, Lahore alumni
Recipients of the Pride of Performance